Scott Sterling may refer to:

 Scott Sterling (golfer) (born 1972), American golfer
 Scott Sterling (fictional), fictional athlete and subject of viral video
 Scott Monroe Sterling, also known as Scott La Rock (1962–1987), American DJ and producer
 Scott Sterling (1980–2012), son of former NBA team owner Donald Sterling
 Scott Sterling (20th century), American professional wrestler and SSW Tag Team Championship winner

See also
Scott Stirling, American ice hockey player
Scotty Stirling, American sports executive and sportswriter